The Pernik sword is a medieval double-edged iron sword unearthed in the ruins of the medieval fortress of Krakra near Pernik, western Bulgaria, on 1 January 1921. It bears an inscription in silver inlay on the blade. The sword is preserved in the National Archaeological Museum of Bulgaria in Sofia.

The blade inscription is typical of the 12th-century "garbled" in nomine type, reading . There is a scholarly tradition of attempts to interpret this type of inscription as abbreviations or contractions, e.g. reading  as  ''. Following such proposals, Mihailov (1985) proposed a tentative reading of the Pernik inscription along the lines of "".

References

Friedrich E. GRÜNZWEIG: Ein Schwert mit Inschrift aus Pernik (Bulgarien), Amsterdamer Beiträge zur älteren Germanistik 61 (2006).
Dentschewa, Emilia: "Langobardische (?) Inschrift auf einem Schwert aus dem 8. Jahrhundert in bulgarischem Boden". In: Beiträge zur Geschichte der deutschen Sprache und Literatur, Band 128 (2006) Heft 1, S. 1-11.
Dentschewa, Emilia: "+IHININIhVILPIDHINIhVILPN+ oder die Botschaft eines Schwertes aus der Zeit des Königreichs der Langobarden (?)" In: Archaeologia Bulgarica IX (2005) Heft 2, S. 99-105.

External links
 Archived version
 Archived version

Archaeological discoveries in Bulgaria
Archaeological discoveries in Europe
Lombard art
Medieval European swords
Medieval Bulgaria
History of Pernik Province
Pernik
1921 archaeological discoveries
Individual weapons